St Blazey is a small town in Cornwall, England, United Kingdom.

St Blaise is the civil parish in which St Blazey is situated; the name St Blaise is also used by the town council. The village of Biscovey and the settlements of St Blazey Gate, Bodelva and West Par lie within the parish boundaries. An electoral ward also exists in the name of St Blaise. The population at the 2011 census was 4,674.

Once an important engineering centre for the local mine and railway industries, the parish is now dominated by the Eden Project.

The town takes its name from the Armenian Saint Blaise and holds a procession and service on his feast day, 3 February.

History
The namesake and patron hallow of St Blazey is Saint Blaise, who in Christian tradition is believed to have "cure[d] toothache, sore throats and cattle diseases".

An Iron Age hillfort Prideaux Castle lies a mile to the north west of the town in the parish of Luxulyan.

The Biscovey Stone is the shaft of an ancient Celtic cross. It was inscribed, but the text is no longer readable. There are several theories about the stone; one says it dates from around 600 AD to show the Saxon advance into the county, another puts the date at around 900 AD. The head is thought to have been removed during the Reformation. The stone served as a gate post near the St Blazey turnpike gate. In 1896 it was moved to St Mary's Church, Biscovey. Arthur Langdon described the stone in 1896: he read the inscription as "+ Alroron Ullici + filius". It was also described by William Borlase in his Antiquities of Cornwall (1754), pp. 363–64.

The church was built between 1440 and 1445 and is dedicated to Saint Blaise. It replaces an earlier church mentioned in 1294. The parish was administered by Tywardreath Priory until the Reformation. It was split from St Austell parish in 1834. The site was originally known by the Cornish names Landrait or Landreath, meaning Church on the Sand. A stone Gothic Latin cross stands in the churchyard but nothing is known about its history.

Until the 16th century the valley below St Blazey was an estuary of the River Par and St Blazey was the lowest crossing point on the river. Tin mining up river caused the estuary to silt up and it had become marsh land by the early 19th century. The Par Canal was built by Joseph Treffry between 1829 and 1835; it forms part of the boundary with the parish of Tywardreath and Par.

The town was once dominated by the local mining industries and their associated transport infrastructure. Historically copper and tin were mined in and around the parish, whilst more recently china clay has been the principal commodity mined. "The Par & St Blazey Consols" or "South Prideaux Wood" was a small tin mine just north of the town and Par Consols Mine lies to the south west. The more extensive Fowey Consols mine lies to the east near Tywardreath.

The port of Par Harbour, which lies within the parish, was developed to ease the transport of these minerals, and initially connected to the mines by the Par Canal. Whilst the port of Par is within the parish, the village of Par is actually just across the River Par, and hence lies in the civil parish of Tywardreath.

The Par Canal was soon replaced by the Cornwall Minerals Railway, which had a depot and station in the town, and still exists as part of the Atlantic Coast Line. Whilst St Blazey depot is still in use, St Blazey station closed to passengers in 1925, and the town is now served by Par station on the Cornish Main Line in Par village.

Tourism

The Eden Project is located within the civil parish, and about a mile and half (2 km) from the centre of the town. The large number of visitors this attracts has led to the development of tourism in the town. Other attractions, such as the Treffry Viaduct and the Luxulyan Valley, are also close by, although actually within the adjoining parish of Luxulyan.

Education
Primary education is provided by Biscovey Nursery and Infant Community School and Biscovey Junior School.

Sport
The town's football team, St Blazey A.F.C., was the first club of England International goalkeeper Nigel Martyn.

The town is also home to St Blazey Cricket Club which has two teams. The cricket club is based at the top of Middleway Road. The club most recently won the Roseveare Cup in 2019, with both the first team and second team also gaining promotion from Division 3 & 5 East respectively.

Notable people
Notable people from the town include Edward Long, the historian, who was born at Roselyon, in 1734, and educated at Liskeard. It is claimed by some as the birthplace of Ralph Allen, notable architect of Bath, although his christening took place at St Columb Major. John Rogers, who supported the introduction of the man engine to Cornish mines, was curate here for a time.

Charles Jeffries, a Commissioner in The Salvation Army, was posted to the town in 1883.

References

External links

 Town Council website
 GENUKI website; St Blazey
 Cornwall Record Office Online Catalogue for St Blazey

 
Towns in Cornwall
Civil parishes in Cornwall